Torresdale station is a SEPTA Regional Rail station in Philadelphia, Pennsylvania. Located at Grant Avenue and James Street in the Torresdale neighborhood of Northeast Philadelphia, it serves the Trenton Line. It is 14.8 miles from 30th Street Station. In 2017 this station saw 1,160 boardings on an average weekday. Though located on Amtrak's Northeast Corridor, Amtrak does not stop at this station. Torresdale has a 331-space parking lot.

Station layout

References

External links
 Current schedule for the SEPTA Trenton line
 SEPTA station page for Torresdale
 Grant Avenue entrance from Google Maps Street View

SEPTA Regional Rail stations
Former Pennsylvania Railroad stations
Stations on the Northeast Corridor
Railway stations in Philadelphia